is a subway station on the Tokyo Metro Marunouchi Line in Nakano, Tokyo, Japan, operated by the Tokyo subway operator Tokyo Metro.

Lines
It is numbered "M-05".

Station layout
The station consists of two underground side platforms serving two tracks on the first basement level. The platforms each have sets of ticket barriers at either end. They are also linked by an underground passageway.

Platforms

History
The station opened on February 8, 1961.

The station facilities were inherited by Tokyo Metro after the privatization of the Teito Rapid Transit Authority (TRTA) in 2004.

Passenger statistics
In fiscal 2011, the station was used by an average of 31,125 passengers daily.

Surrounding area
 Sugiyama Park

References

External links

 Shin-nakano Station information (Tokyo Metro) 

Stations of Tokyo Metro
Tokyo Metro Marunouchi Line
Railway stations in Tokyo
Railway stations in Japan opened in 1961